Howard Harrison Petway (March 1884 – October 27, 1918) was an American Negro league pitcher in the 1900s.

A native of Nashville, Tennessee, Petway was the brother of fellow Negro leaguer Bruce Petway. He played for the Leland Giants in 1906. Petway died in St. Paul, Minnesota in 1918 at age 34.

References

External links
Baseball statistics and player information from Baseball-Reference Black Baseball Stats and Seamheads

1884 births
1918 deaths
Leland Giants players
Baseball pitchers
Baseball players from Nashville, Tennessee
20th-century African-American people